NKP may refer to:
  The abbreviation and identifying marks of the Nickel Plate Road
 NetKernel Protocol
 New Korea Party, a political party in South Korea
 New Komeito Party, a Japanese political party
 New York, Chicago and St. Louis Railroad, the Nickel Plate Road
 Communist Party of Norway (Norges Kommunistiske Parti)
 Nakhon Phanom Royal Thai Air Force Base, which was used by the United States Pacific Air Forces during the Vietnam War
 Nitrogen, Potassium, and Phosphorus, three essential plant nutrients.